Mohammad Imran Rahim is a First-class and List A cricketer from Bangladesh. He was born on 7 January 1983 in Sylhet, Chittagong and is sometimes known by his nickname Lalu.  He made his debut in 2000/01 for Sylhet Division and played until 2002/03.  A right-handed tail end batsman and slow left arm orthodox bowler, his best bowling of 4 for 51 came against Khulna Division.

References 

Sylhet Division cricketers
Living people
Bangladeshi cricketers
1983 births